The fifth season of the American television series This Is Us continues to follow the lives and connections of the Pearson family across several time periods. The season is produced by Rhode Island Ave. Productions, Zaftig Films, and 20th Television, with Dan Fogelman, Isaac Aptaker, and Elizabeth Berger serving as showrunners.

The series was renewed for a fourth, fifth, and sixth season in May 2019. The season stars an ensemble cast featuring Milo Ventimiglia, Mandy Moore, Sterling K. Brown, Chrissy Metz, Justin Hartley, Susan Kelechi Watson, Chris Sullivan, Jon Huertas, Niles Fitch, Logan Shroyer, Hannah Zeile, Mackenzie Hancsicsak, Parker Bates, Eris Baker, Faithe Herman, Lonnie Chavis, Lyric Ross, Asante Blackk and Griffin Dunne.

The fifth season premiered on October 27, 2020 and concluded on May 25, 2021. The season consisted of 16 episodes.

Cast and characters

Main 

 Milo Ventimiglia as Jack Pearson
 Mandy Moore as Rebecca Pearson
 Sterling K. Brown as Randall Pearson
 Niles Fitch as teenage Randall Pearson
 Lonnie Chavis as young Randall Pearson
 Chrissy Metz as Kate Pearson
 Hannah Zeile as teenage Kate Pearson
 Mackenzie Hancsicsak as young Kate Pearson
 Justin Hartley as Kevin Pearson
 Logan Shroyer as teenage Kevin Pearson
 Parker Bates as young Kevin Pearson
 Susan Kelechi Watson as Beth Pearson
 Chris Sullivan as Toby Damon
 Jon Huertas as Miguel Rivas
 Caitlin Thompson as Madison Simons
 Eris Baker as Tess Pearson
 Faithe Herman as Annie Pearson
 Lyric Ross as Deja Pearson
 Asante Blackk as Malik Hodges

Recurring
Timothy Omundson as Gregory, Toby and Kate's neighbor.
Jennifer C. Holmes as Laurel DuBois, Randall's birth mother who was William's lover.
Vien Hong as Hai Lang, Vietnamese American refugee and fisherman who knew Randall's birth mother.
Griffin Dunne as Nicky Pearson
Michael Angarano as young Nicky Pearson
 Jennifer Morrison as Cassidy Sharp

Guest
 George Eads as Coach
 Phylicia Rashad as Carol Clarke
 Alexandra Breckenridge as Sophie
 Melanie Liburd as Zoe Baker

Episodes

Production

Development 
On May 12, 2019, NBC renewed the series for its fourth, fifth and sixth seasons, at 18 episodes each, for a total of 54 additional episodes. Due to later COVID-related complications, the fifth season was shortened to 16 episodes, as announced during on-air promotion of the season's fourteenth episode.

Filming 
Production on season five started on September 24, 2020. COVID-related production delays resulted in filming being stalled for multiple weeks in January 2021, which in turn resulted in the broadcast of new episodes being postponed by almost a month.

Reception

Ratings

References

External links

2020 American television seasons
2021 American television seasons
This Is Us
Television shows about the COVID-19 pandemic